

The bordered white or pine looper (Bupalus piniaria), is a moth of the family Geometridae. Among these, it belongs to tribe Bupalini of the subfamily Ennominae. B. piniaria is a common species throughout the western Palearctic region, the Near East and North Africa. However, its presence in certain regions – e.g. the northern Balkans – is doubtful.

It is (under its original scientific name Phalaena piniaria) the type species of its genus Bupalus, as well as the junior objective synonyms Catograpta, Chleuastes and Phaophyga, and the preoccupied Bupala. Via its genus, it is also the type of the Bupalini.

Three subspecies are generally recognized, while two additional ones are doubtfully distinct:
 Bupalus piniaria bernieri de Lajonquiere, 1958
 Bupalus piniaria espagnolus Eitschberger & Steiniger, 1975
 Bupalus piniaria flavescens White, 1876 (usually included in piniaria)
 Bupalus piniaria mughusaria Gumppenberg, 1887 (usually included in piniaria)
 Bupalus piniaria piniaria (Linnaeus, 1758)

In addition, many forms (e.g. kolleri) have also been named.

Description and ecology

This moth is an inhabitant of coniferous woodland. The adults fly in May and June, sometimes later (up to August or so) in the north of the range. Their wingspan is 34–40 mm. This is a variable species with strong sexual dimorphism, always conspicuous in the antennae which are combed in the males and plain in the females. Females, particularly when filled with ripe eggs, also have a plumper abdomen.

The male has upperwings with broad dark brown borders and spots and a background varying from white in the north to deep yellow in southern populations. The female is plainer, varying from yellow to brown on the upperwings, which have slightly darker crosswise stripes. In both sexes, the wingtips are darkest. The underwings are less dimorphic, orange-brown with darker tips on the forewings and marbled light brown with a whitish lengthwise stripe on the hindwings in both sexes. The male's underwings have a wider whitish hindwing stripe and darker forewing tips, while the females have a more contrasting hindwing pattern. All four wings are bordered by a short fringe of alternating sections of white and dark brown hairs. Bilateral gynandromorphs are easily recognized in this species.

The caterpillar larva is green with pale lines and usually feeds on various species of pine (Pinus), especially Scots pine (P. sylvestris) and European black pine (P. nigra). It has also been recorded feeding on Douglas-fir (Pseudotsuga), larch (Larix) and spruce (Picea, e.g. Norway spruce P. abies). This species overwinters as a pupa. It can be a serious pest in conifer plantations.

Footnotes

References
  (2007): Domino Guide to the Insects of Britain and Western Europe (Revised ed.). A. & C. Black, London. 
  (2009): Bupalus piniaria. Version 2.1, 22 December 2009. Retrieved 13 May 2010.
  (2004): Butterflies and Moths of the World, Generic Names and their Type-species – Bupalus. Version of 5 November 2004. Retrieved 13 May 2010.
  (1942): Ein geteilter Zwitter von Bupalus piniarius L. ["A bilateral gynandromorph of the Bordered White"]. Zeitschrift des Wiener Entomologen-Vereins 27: 287-288 [in German]. PDF fulltext
  (2001): Markku Savela's Lepidoptera and some other life forms – Bupalus piniarius [sic]. Version of 1 October 2001. Retrieved 13 May 2010.
  (1984): Colour Identification Guide to Moths of the British Isles.

External links

Bordered white at UKMoths
Bordered white at kimmos.freeshell.org
Lepidoptera of Belgium
Trees for Life 
Vlindernet.nl 

Bupalini
Moths described in 1758
Moths of Europe
Moths of Asia
Taxa named by Carl Linnaeus